Pugazh is a 2016 Indian Tamil-language action thriller film written and directed by Manimaran and co-produced by Varun Manian. The film stars Jai and Surbhi, while Karunas, RJ Balaji, G. Marimuthu, and Piraisoodan play supporting roles. Vivek-Mervin composed the film's music. The film was released on 18 March 2016 and received mixed reviews from critics.

Cast

 Jai as Pugazhendhi (a) Pugazh 
 Surbhi as Bhuvana
 Karunas as Pugazh's brother
 RJ Balaji as Balaji
 G. Marimuthu as Dass
 Piraisoodan as Selvanayagam
 Vikram as Venkat
 Supergood Subramani as Venkat's father
 Kannan as Bhuvana's brother 
 Vijayamuthu as Muthu
 Kamal Hassan
 Ravisankar
 Valliappan
 Rajani
 Velraj in a cameo appearance
 AC Gaayathri in a cameo appearance

Production
The film was first reported in November 2013, when it was revealed that Manimaran had cast Jai and Priya Anand to star in his second directorial venture. Anirudh Ravichander was suggested as the film's music composer, while a simultaneously shot Telugu version with Siddharth and Hansika Motwani was also considered. Manimaran added that his first choice was initially Dhanush, but his busy schedule prompted him to select Jai, while the film would be titled Podiyan, and that filming would begin in 2014.

Varun Manian announced in July 2014, that he would produce the Tamil film alongside Sushant Prasad and Govindaraj of Film Department Studios, while Velraj was revealed as the cinematographer. Reports suggested that the film may be re-titled as Pugazh, after the title became re-available following a shelved venture by Aascar Films and actor Vijay. The title Pugazh was also wanted by Sarathkumar, who later permitted the film to take it. In August 2014, reports emerged that Trisha had liked the script of the film and was re-allocating her dates to try and fit the film into her schedule. However, following the end of her engagement with producer Varun Manian, she opted out of the project. Manimaran later stated that he was not interested in casting Trisha, as she did not suit the role, but the producer had been adamant. By November 2014, the film was launched as Pugazh with Surabhi revealed to be the film's lead heroine.

Release
At the Chennai Box Office, Pugazh took an average opening, with collections of Rs.  from 171 shows in the first weekend. However, the film's collections dropped drastically in the second week, and the total collection at the Chennai Box Office was Rs.  from 18 shows, settling for a below average verdict.

Baradwaj Rangan of the Hindu wrote, "Pugazh is a collection of good bits of writing, good intentions, but they don't add up to a consistently good film because it wants to be both a rooted ensemble drama and a masala-style solo-hero narrative. We get neither."

Soundtrack
The soundtrack was composed by Vivek-Mervin in their second venture and collaboration with Jai after Vadacurry.

References

External links

2016 films
Indian political thriller films
Indian action drama films
Indian action thriller films
2010s Tamil-language films
2016 action drama films
2016 action thriller films
Political action films
2010s political thriller films